There are several municipalities and communities have the name Horrenbach:

Horrenbach, Germany in Krautheim, Baden-Württemberg
Horrenbach, Switzerland, part of Horrenbach-Buchenin in the Canton of Bern
Horrenbach-Buchen, a municipality in the Canton of Berne